The Essential Lynyrd Skynyrd, is a two-disc compilation of Lynyrd Skynyrd in the peak years of its classic lineup (1971–1977). The double album was remastered and re-released in 2006 as part of Universal's Gold series.

Track listing

Disc one
"Sweet Home Alabama" (Ed King, Gary Rossington, Ronnie Van Zant) – 4:45
"I Ain't the One" (Rossington, Van Zant) – 3:54
"Was I Right or Wrong?" (Rossington, Van Zant) – 5:24
"Gimme Three Steps" (Allen Collins, Van Zant) – 4:31
"Workin' for MCA" (King, Van Zant) – 4:48
"Simple Man" (Rossington, Van Zant) – 5:58
"Swamp Music" (King, Van Zant) – 3:32
"The Ballad of Curtis Loew" (Collins, Van Zant) – 4:52
"Saturday Night Special" (King, Van Zant) – 5:12
"Mr. Banker" (King, Rossington, Van Zant) – 5:22
"Comin' Home" (Original version) (Collins, Van Zant) – 5:30
"Call Me the Breeze" (J.J. Cale) – 5:09
"Free Bird" (Collins, Van Zant) – 9:10

Disc two
"What's Your Name?" (Rossington, Van Zant) – 3:33
"Whiskey Rock-a-Roller" (Live) (King, Billy Powell, Van Zant) – 4:16
"Tuesday's Gone" (Collins, Van Zant) – 7:34
"Double Trouble" (Collins, Van Zant) – 2:50
"I Know a Little" (Steve Gaines) – 3:28
"Four Walls of Raiford" (Undubbed demo) (Jeff Carlisi, Van Zant) – 4:14
"I Never Dreamed" (Gaines, Van Zant) – 5:21
"Gimme Back My Bullets" (Live) (Rossington, Van Zant) – 3:42
"You Got That Right" (Gaines, Van Zant) – 3:47
"All I Can Do Is Write About It" (Acoustic version) (Collins, Van Zant) – 4:24
"That Smell" (Collins, Van Zant) – 5:51
"Free Bird" (Live)" (Collins, Van Zant) – 13:41

Disc 1, Tracks 1, 5, 7-8, 12 from Second Helping (1974)
Disc 1, Tracks 2, 4, 6, and 13 and Disc 2, Track 3 from (Pronounced 'Lĕh-'nérd 'Skin-'nérd) (1973)
Disc 1, Track 3 from Skynyrd's First and... Last (1978)
Disc 1, Track 9 from Nuthin' Fancy (1975)
Disc 1, Track 10 from Legend (1987)
Disc 2, Tracks 1, 5, 7, 9, and 11 from Street Survivors (1977)
Disc 2, Tracks 2 and 12 from One More from the Road (1976)
Disc 2, Track 4 from Gimme Back My Bullets (1976)
Disc 2, Tracks 6, 8, and 10 from the Lynyrd Skynyrd Box Set (1991)
Disc 1, Track 11 is previously unreleased (1998)

Live songs
Disc 2, Track 2 recorded 7/7/1976 at the Fox Theatre in Atlanta, Georgia
Disc 2, Tracks 8 and 12 recorded 7/8/1976 at the Fox Theatre in Atlanta, Georgia

Certifications

References

Lynyrd Skynyrd compilation albums
1998 compilation albums
Geffen Records compilation albums
MCA Records compilation albums
1998 greatest hits albums